Alexander Phillis (born 27 January 1994) is an Australian motorcycle racer. In 2011 he participated for the first time in a 125cc World Championship event, as a wild-card rider in the Australian round at Phillip Island but failed to qualify for the race. Phillis has also competed Supersport World Championship and Superbike World Championship. He is son of the former motorcycle racer Rob Phillis. He currently competes in the Australian Superbike Championship, aboard a Suzuki GSX-R1000.

Career statistics

Grand Prix motorcycle racing

By season

Races by year
(key)

Supersport World Championship

Races by year
(key)

Superbike World Championship

Races by year
(key) (Races in bold indicate pole position, races in italics indicate fastest lap)

References

External links
Profile on MotoGP.com
Profile on WorldSBK.com

Living people
1994 births
Australian motorcycle racers
125cc World Championship riders
Supersport World Championship riders
Superbike World Championship riders
Sportspeople from Albury
Sportsmen from New South Wales
20th-century Australian people
21st-century Australian people